BT Consumer is the main retail division of United Kingdom telecommunications company BT Group that provides fixed-line, mobile, broadband and digital television to consumers in the UK. It buys access to some of these services from BT's other divisions: Openreach and EE. It is the largest consumer fixed-line and broadband ISP in the UK.

It was established alongside BT Business (now combined with BT Enterprise) following a two-way split from former division, BT Retail in 2013 to allow BT to "better serve its customers and focus even more on delivering its strategic priorities". It took on the consumer operations of BT Retail that involved BT Consumer together with BT Wi-fi (part of BT Enterprises) and the consumer part of BT Ireland. It retained its name following BT's new organisational structure that took effect in April 2016 after its acquisition of EE, with no changes made to the division. On 28 July 2017, BT announced organisational changes to "simplify its operating model, strengthen accountabilities and accelerate its transformation" and involves bringing together its BT Consumer and EE divisions into a new unified BT Consumer division that will operate across three brands – BT, EE and Plusnet. It will take effect from 1 April 2018.

Products and history
BT Consumer provides fibre-to-the-cabinet (FTTC) and fibre-to-the-property (FTTP) broadband, IPTV and mobile services nationally, as well as providing access to the BT Wi-Fi hotspot service. Since 2020, BT Consumer has begun preparing for the 2025 switch off of the public switched telephone network (PSTN) by introducing their Digital Voice (VoIP) service, which allows calls to be made and received through a Smart Hub 2.

In March 2015, BT launched its mobile virtual network operator (MVNO) product, BT Mobile, in the United Kingdom. The service, that uses the EE network following an MVNO agreement in March 2014, was BT's first offering of mobile services since 2002, when BT Cellnet was spun-off to form O2. It also made use of the spectrum BT won in the 4G auction held by Ofcom in 2013. 

The following year, on 29 January 2016, BT Group's £12.5 billion acquisition of EE was officially completed following ratification from the UK's Competition and Markets Authority. BT Mobile offers handsets and SIM-only plans through EE's 4G network, with broadband customers able to get a discount on mobile products. Since the roll-out of EE's 5G network, BT Mobile customers wanting to take advantage of the faster network are encouraged to take up products through EE, with BT Mobile deciding against offering 5G services. 

On 29 January 2020, BT announced that it had completed its commitment of having 100% of customers service calls into its consumer business answered in the UK and Ireland, becoming the only major communication provider to do so in the process. As part of the commitment, calls are routed to the nearest call centre that's able to deal with the relevant customer enquiry, which Consumer CEO Marc Allera said is part of "providing a personal, and local, service is to our customers."

In February 2021, BT and EE launched a new home wifi service that combines the power of its fixed-line broadband services with its mobile network. With the introduction of the Hybrid Connect device, customers who lose connection through their Smart Hub 2 will automatically be connected to EE's mobile network, giving them a continuous, interrupted connection that BT described as "unbreakable".

References

External links
 

BT Group
Telecommunications companies of the United Kingdom
Internet service providers of the United Kingdom
Companies established in 1981